Police Commissioner Mustapha Ismail was Administrator of Kwara State from December 1993 to September 1994, and was later Military Administrator of Adamawa State between August 1996 and August 1998 during the military regime of General Sani Abacha.

In January 1995 he opened the 16th General Assembly of Broadcasting Organizations of Nigeria (BON) in Yola, Adamawa State, asking the delegates to help build a nation with hope, pride, unity and peaceful co-existence for present and future generations.

References

Year of birth missing (living people)
Living people
Nigerian Muslims
Governors of Adamawa State
Governors of Kwara State